Petri Juhani Heinonen (born 12 September 1988) is a Finnish basketball player. The  center/forward Heinonen plays for Tampereen Pyrintö in Korisliiga. Alongside Finnish competitions, Heinonen has represented Pyrintö in Baltic Basketball League.

Heinonen won Finnish championship with Espoon Honka in 2008 and with Pyrintö in 2014. He was elected Korisliiga's Rookie of the Year in 2007 and Korisliiga's Most Developed Player of the Year in 2011. He has also played in Finland's national team. At 2011 Summer Universiade Heinonen played for seventh-positioned Finland. At the same year Heinonen belonged to Finland's squad that won its first Nordic championship for 28 years.

Trophies and awards
Korisliiga's Rookie of the Year in 2007
Korisliiga's Most Developed Player of the Year in 2011.
Finnish championship 2008 and 2014
Baltic League: fourth in 2014

National team 
 Nordic championship in 2011
 Summer Universiades: seventh in 2011

References

External links
Petri Heinonen Finnish Basketball Association
Petri Heinonen Eurobasket.com

1988 births
Living people
Espoon Honka players
Finnish men's basketball players
Sportspeople from Tampere
Tampereen Pyrintö players
Centers (basketball)
Power forwards (basketball)